Marin Čilić was the defending champion, but chose not to participate that year.

Fernando Verdasco won in the final 6–4, 7–6(8–6) against Sam Querrey.

Seeds
All seeds receive a bye into the second round. 

  Nikolay Davydenko (quarterfinals)
  Fernando Verdasco (champion)
  Tommy Robredo (second round)
  David Ferrer (withdrew)
  Mardy Fish (second round)
  Sam Querrey (final)
  Igor Andreev (semifinals)
  Victor Hănescu (third round)
  Nicolás Almagro (second round)
  Jérémy Chardy (second round)
  Jürgen Melzer (quarterfinals)
  Philipp Petzschner (second round)
  Andreas Beck (second round)
  Igor Kunitsyn (third round)
  Fabrice Santoro (third round)
  Andreas Seppi (third round)

Draw

Finals

Top half

Section 1

Section 2

Bottom half

Section 3

Section 4

External links
 Main Draw
 Qualifying Draw

Men's Singles